Max Belford Coley (October 5, 1927 - August 6, 1994) was an American football coach. He served as an assistant coach for the Pittsburgh Steelers, Denver Broncos, San Diego Chargers and Los Angeles Rams.

Personal life
Coley's memorial service was held in Long Beach, California. He was the owner of CM Carpet in Palm Desert.

References

1927 births

1994 deaths 
Northeastern Oklahoma A&M Golden Norsemen football players
San Jose State Spartans football players
San Jose State Spartans football coaches
Oregon Ducks football coaches
Pittsburgh Steelers coaches
Denver Broncos coaches
San Diego Chargers coaches
Los Angeles Rams coaches